Szymanów may refer to the following places in Poland:
Szymanów, Środa Śląska County in Lower Silesian Voivodeship (south-west Poland)
Szymanów, Świdnica County in Lower Silesian Voivodeship (south-west Poland)
Szymanów, Trzebnica County in Lower Silesian Voivodeship (south-west Poland)
Szymanów, Wrocław County in Lower Silesian Voivodeship (south-west Poland)
Szymanów, Łódź Voivodeship (central Poland)
Szymanów, Lipsko County in Masovian Voivodeship (east-central Poland)
Szymanów, Piaseczno County in Masovian Voivodeship (east-central Poland)
Szymanów, Sochaczew County in Masovian Voivodeship (east-central Poland)
Szymanów, Greater Poland Voivodeship (west-central Poland)